Kao Su-po (born 31 October 1968) is a Taiwanese politician, professor, and public servant. He was a member of the Legislative Yuan from 2005 to 2008, and led the Mongolian and Tibetan Affairs Commission between 2008 and 2011. He contested the Tainan mayorality in 2018, losing the office to Huang Wei-cher.

Personal life
Kao Su-po (also known as Gao Sipo or Apo) was born in the Zhongxi District of Tainan City on October 31, 1968, and Jiali is his ancestral home. Kao is married to Chou Yun-tsai, Deputy Director and R&D Advisor in Chief at the 21st Century Foundation, and they have one son. Kao's inspiration for becoming a lawyer is his father, Kao Yu-jen, who owned a law firm in his hometown, was the former Taiwan Provincial Assembly speaker and Tainan County commissioner from 1973–1976. It was through his father's work and commitment to the people of Tainan as an elected representative for the county that Kao found his love for law and public service. As Kao states: "The legal profession can be a business, a resource, and a social shaper the crosses national borders".

Academic career
Kao obtained his LL.B in 1990 at the National Taiwan University Law school, and later received his J.D in law in 1998 from George Washington University in the United States. During his studies at George Washington, Kao interned at Capitol Hill where he witnessed the collaborative nature of U.S. democracy, specifically how lawmakers, diplomats, entrepreneurs, think tank scholars, and politicians all worked together to "influence the future of the world". Returning to Tainan after his studies, he strove to improve its political system. After obtaining his degree, he became an associate professor and the director in the Law Departments at Central Police University and Shih Hsin University respectively.

Political career
Kao contested the 2004 legislative elections as a People First Party candidate. He took office in February 2005 and joined the Kuomintang one year later. He was named minister without portfolio and head of the Mongolian and Tibetan Affairs Commission in May 2008. He resigned from both posts in January 2011.

Mongolian and Tibetan Affairs Commission
In February 2010, Kao said that the MTAC was making a policy change from increasing Taiwan's relations with Mongolia and Central Tibetan Administration to promote cross-strait relations. Additionally, he saw a possible merger of MTAC into the Mainland Affairs Council as a way to help MTAC “find a proper place when dealing with Mongolian and Tibetan affairs.”

2018 Tainan mayoral elections

Kao ran and won against Huang Hsiu-shuang, former president of the National University of Tainan during the KMT primary elections in May 2018. As the KMT mayoral candidate for Tainan, Kao's campaign addressed three main policy areas: 1) reversing and reimbursing Tainan residents for the increase in housing taxes; 2) making health insurance free for the elderly ages 65 and above and improving public daycare centers; and 3) preserving Tainan's heritage by preventing the demolition of old buildings for the railway expansion. Additionally, Kao sought to revive and expand industries in Tainan, such as reopening China's contract with milk fish farmers in Syuejia District of Tainan and giving local factories access to global markets.

Taking TVBS News on a tour of his childhood home on August 21, 2018, Kao explained the importance of family and maintaining the history of the ancient city. When asked by anchor Amber Chien if he agreed with critiques that KMT was outdated and full of old representatives, Kao explained that although there needs to be more youth involvement in the party, the party should not give up the integrity of KMT history and heritage because there is value in it.

The Democratic Progressive Party has been the ruling party for Tainan for over 25 years, garnering a lot of attention for the contending KMT campaign in the municipality. In the Taipei Times, Kao states: "The people of Tainan have grown so accustomed to a DPP mayor that they cannot even imagine what the city could become under a leader from a different party". Therefore, Kao hopes to not only usurp DPP's quarter of a century rule over Tainan, but also provide much needed change to its struggling economy.  The DPP candidate for the mayoral election is Huang Wei-cher, a lawmaker who beat five other contenders during DPP's primaries in March 2018.

References

External links
 

1968 births
Living people
Government ministers of Taiwan
George Washington University Law School alumni
Academic staff of the Central Police University
People First Party Members of the Legislative Yuan
Tainan Members of the Legislative Yuan
Kuomintang Members of the Legislative Yuan in Taiwan
Members of the 6th Legislative Yuan